Lynnwood Convention Center is a suburban convention center located in Lynnwood, Washington, near Seattle. The $31 million facility opened in 2005 and is managed by Oak View Group (OVG). The convention center was first proposed in the 1980s, but was rejected by voters on three occasions; the formation of a public facilities district in 1999 funded its construction.

History

Lynnwood, historically a bedroom community of Seattle and nearby Everett, began pursuing a convention center and performing arts venue in the late 1960s. Boosters from the Edmonds Community College attempted to lure a state-sponsored "festival center" in 1977, but failed to garner support over a site near Federal Way. A 3,000-seat arts-and-convention center on the college campus was also proposed in 1980, but failed to receive funds from the Washington State Legislature. In the November 1982 election, voters in south Snohomish County (including Lynnwood and nearby cities) rejected the formation of a special district to develop the arts-and-convention center, and also repealed a local sales tax, planned to be used to fund its construction. The boosters later decided against scheduling another public vote on the arts-and-convention center, and ultimately decided in 1985 to split the projects into two: a performing arts center on the college campus, and a convention center elsewhere in Lynnwood. A ballot measure was attempted again in 1988, but failed because of low voter turnout.

In 1995-96 The South Snohomish County Chamber of Commerce, representing over 800 businesses in the county, conducted a feasibility study to build a convention center.  Several sight locations were viewed such as the Holiday Inn location on 128th in Everett and the Chevron gas station on the corner of 44th & 200th St. in Lynnwood.  The Chamber of Commerce was instrumental in laying the ground work for the future convention center.
 
A second, major campaign to build an 800-seat, $45 million arts-and-convention center in Lynnwood began in 1998. The proposal was sent to local voters in May 1998, with mixed support from politicians, and was rejected by 75 percent. In 1999, the city government established a public facilities district, a type of local special district that would be able to fund a convention center using a state sales tax rebate. The estimated cost of the  convention center led the city to reconsider its plans in 2000, instead opting for a smaller,  facility costing $32 million. The convention center was funded by $27.9 million in issued bonds, as well as rebate sales taxes from the state government and hotel-motel taxes collected by the county and city.

Construction on the convention center began in October 2003. Howard S. Wright Companies was selected to build the facility, while SMG was awarded the rights to operate it. The convention center opened on April 30, 2005, and immediately came into competition with the Everett Events Center (now Xfinity Arena) in downtown Everett. After completion of the convention center, the Lynnwood Public Facilities District attempted to build a 200-room Hilton Garden Inn hotel on an adjacent property. The proposed hotel was scrapped in 2008 after the main developer withdrew from negotiations, citing the then-ongoing financial crisis; by then, the convention center had an annual attendance of 82,000 people. A 155-room hotel was eventually built on the property a decade later under a different developer in conjunction with an eight-story apartment building.

In its first decade in operation, the Lynnwood Convention Center hosted over 3,900 events and a total attendance of 753,000 people. An estimated $24.8 million in economic impact was generated by the convention center in 2014.

Facilities

The Lynnwood Convention Center is located on 196th Street Southwest, a block west of Interstate 5 in central Lynnwood. It is southwest of the Alderwood Mall, and within the city's planned city center.

References

External links

 

2005 establishments in Washington (state)
Buildings and structures completed in 2005
Buildings and structures in Snohomish County, Washington
Convention centers in Washington (state)
Lynnwood, Washington